"All About the Love Again" is a 2009 single from American R&B artist Stevie Wonder. The song was originally written for the 2008 presidential election. The single has been performed at the 2009 inauguration of Barack Obama, American Idol, and The Ellen DeGeneres Show. The song was nominated for the Grammy for Best Male Pop Vocal Performance at The 52nd Annual Grammy Awards of 2010.

2009 singles
Stevie Wonder songs
Songs written by Stevie Wonder
2009 songs
Motown singles
Song recordings produced by Stevie Wonder